(Z)-6-Dodecen-4-olide is a volatile, unsaturated lipid and γ-lactone found in dairy products, and secreted as a pheromone by some even-toed ungulates. It has a creamy, cheesy, fatty flavour with slight floral undertones in small concentrations, but contributes towards the strong, musky smell of a few species of antelope and deer in higher concentrations.

Function 
(Z)-6-Dodecen-4-olide is believed to play a part in olfactory communication between individuals of the Columbian black-tailed deer (Odocoileus hemionus columbianus), and is secreted into urine during a rut. (Z)-6-Dodecen-4-olide is then deposited onto the tuft of hair making up the tarsal gland of the deer, as the urine runs down the gland, during a behavior called rub-urination. Similarly, it has also been identified in secretions of the interdigital and pedal glands of the bontebok (Damaliscus pygargus) and the blesbok (Damaliscus pygargus phillipsi) where it is believed to play a role in carrying information about the dominance status, sex, health condition and possibly other characteristics of the animal it came from. The (Z)-6-dodecen-4-olide is replenished daily to maintain the pungent smell. It has also been isolated from Polianthes tuberosa, a perennial plant used in the perfume industry since the 17th century for its powerful floral scent.

References

Lactones
Unsaturated compounds